Nellemieke Brouwer (born 20 May 1953) is a Dutch former professional tennis player.

Brouwer, a player from Heemskerk in North Holland, had a win over Tine Zwaan at the 1972 Dutch national championships. She was included in a development squad which toured Australia in late 1973 and made the singles second round of the Australian Open, losing to Patricia Coleman.

References

External links
 
 

1953 births
Living people
Dutch female tennis players
Sportspeople from North Holland
People from Heemskerk